Water polo at the 2004 Summer Olympics took place at the Olympic Aquatic Centre where women competed for only the second time in the event at the Summer Olympics.

Twelve teams competed in the men's event, where Russia was trying to avenge their defeat by Hungary at the Sydney Olympics. There were eight teams in the women's event, where holders Australia were hoping to retain the title.


Men's teams
Group A: Croatia, Hungary, Kazakhstan, Russia, Serbia and Montenegro and United States.
Group B: Australia, Egypt, Germany, Greece, Italy and Spain

Women's teams
Group A: Australia, Greece, Italy and Kazakhstan.
Group B: Canada, Hungary, Russia and United States.

Qualification

Men`s

Women`s 

 Canada took the place of the African team.

Medalists

Men's

Women's

Teams

Men's rosters

Australia
 Pietro Figlioli, Trent Franklin, Toby Jenkins, Craig Miller, Sam McGegor, Tim Neesham, Aleksandr Osadchuk, Dean Semmens, James Stanton, Rafael Sterk, Nathan Thomas, Thomas Whalan and Gavin Woods.
 Head coach: Erkin Shagaev.

Croatia
 Samir Barač, Damir Burić, Elvis Fatović, Nikola Franković, Igor Hinić, Vjekoslav Kobeščak, Danijel Premuš, Dubravko Šimenc, Mile Smodlaka, Ratko Štritof, Frano Vićan, Goran Volarević and Tihomil Vranješ.
 Head coach: Zoran Roje.

Egypt
 Ragy Abdel Hady, Karim Abdelmohsen, Ahmed abdo, Ahmed Badr, Ahmed El khouly, Shady El Helw, Omar El Sammany, Mohamed Gamaleldin, Sherif Khalil, Bassel Mashhour, Mohamed Rateb, Mohamed Mekkawi, Amr Mohamed, Walid Rezk, Hassan Sultan, Bassem Hemdan and Ibrahim Zaher
 Head coach: Adel Shamala.

Germany
 Steffen Dierolf, Lukasz Kieloch, Tobias Kreuzmann, Soeren Mackeben, Heiko Nossek, Jens Pohlmann, Marc Politze, Thomas Schertwitis, Fabian Schroedter, Alexander Tchigir, Patrick Weissinger, Tim Wollthan and Michael Zellmer.
 Head coach: Hagen Stamm.

Greece
 Christos Afroudakis, Georgios Afroudakis, Theodoros Chatzitheodorou, Nikolaos Deligiannis, Theodoros Kalakonas, Konstantinos Loudis, Dimitrios Mazis, Georgios Reppas, Stefanos Santa, Anastasios Schizas, Argyris Theodoropoulos, Ioannis Thomakos and Antonios Vlontakis.
 Head coach: Alessandro Campagna.

Hungary
 Tibor Benedek, Péter Biros, Rajmund Fodor, István Gergely, Tamás Kásás, Gergely Kiss, Norbert Madaras, Tamás Molnár, Ádám Steinmetz, Barnabás Steinmetz, Zoltán Szécsi, Tamás Varga and Attila Vári
 Head coach: Dénes Kemény.

Italy
 Alberto Angelini, Fabio Bencivenga, Leonardo Binchi, Fabrizio Buonocore, Alessandro Calcaterra, Roberto Calcaterra, Maurizio Felugo, Goran Fiorentini, Marco Gerini, Francesco Postiglione, Bogdan Rath, Carlo Silipo and Stefano Tempesti.
 Head coach: Paolo de Crescenzo.

Kazakhstan
 Daniyar Abulgazin, Sergey Drozdov, Alexandr Elke, Alexandr Gaidukov, Sergey Gorovoy, Alexandr Polukhin, Artemiy Sevostyanov, Alexandr Shidlovskiy, Alexandr Shvedov, Yuriy Smolovyy, Igor Zagoruiko, Ivan Zaytsev and Yevgeniy Zhilyayev.
 Head coach: Askar Orazalinov.

Russia
 Roman Balashov, Revaz Tchomakhidze, Alexander Yerishev, Aleksandr Fyodorov, Serguei Garbouzov, Dmitry Gorshkov, Nikolay Kozlov, Nikolai Maximov, Andrei Reketchinski, Dmitri Stratan, Vitaly Yurchik, Marat Zakirov and Irek Zinnurov.
 Head coach: Aleksandr Kabanov.

Spain
 Ángel Andreo, Daniel Ballart, Xavier García, Salvador Gómez, Gabriel Hernández Paz, Gustavo Marcos, Guillermo Molina, Daniel Moro, Iván Moro, Sergi Pedrerol, Iván Pérez, Jesús Rollán and Javier Sanchez Toril.
 Head coach: Joan Jane.

Serbia and Montenegro
 Aleksandar Ćirić, Vladimir Gojković, Danilo Ikodinović, Viktor Jelenić, Predrag Jokić, Nikola Kuljača, Slobodan Nikić, Aleksandar Šapić, Dejan Savić, Denis Šefik, Petar Trbojević, Vanja Udovičić and Vladimir Vujasinović.
 Head coach: Nenad Manojlović.

United States
 Omar Amr, Tony Azevedo, Ryan Bailey, Layne Beaubien, Brandon Brooks, Genai Kerr, Daniel Klatt, Brett Ormsby, Jeffrey Powers, Christopher Segesman, Jesse Smith, Wolf Wigo and Adam Wright.
 Head coach: Ratko Rudić.

Women's rosters

Australia
 Belinda Brooks, Naomi Castle, Nikita Cuffe, Joanne Fox, Jemma Brownlow, Kate Gynther, Kelly Heuchan, Emma Knox, Elise Norwood, Melissa Rippon, Rebecca Rippon, Bronwyn Smith and Jodie Stuhmcke.
 Head coach: István Gorgenyi.

Canada
 Marie Luc Arpin, Johanne Begin, Cora Campbell, Melissa Collins, Andrea Dewar, Valerie Dionne, Ann Dow, Susan Gardiner, Marianne Illing, Whynter Lamarre, Rachel Riddell, Christine Robinson and Jana Salat.
 Head coach: Patrick Oaten.

Greece
 Dimitra Asilian, Georgia Ellinaki, Eftychia Karagianni, Angeliki Karapataki, Stavroula Kozompoli, Georgia Lara, Kyriaki Liosi, Antiopi Melidoni, Antonia Moraiti, Evangelia Moraitidou, Anthoula Mylonaki, Aikaterini Oikonomopoulou and Antigoni Roumpesi.
 Head coach:Kyriakos Iosifidis.

Hungary
 Rita Dravucz, Anett Gyore, Dora Kisteleki, Aniko Pelle, Ágnes Primász, Mercedes Stieber, Krisztina Szremko, Zsuzsanna Tiba, Andrea Toth, Agnes Valkay, Erzsebet Valkay, Krisztina Zantleitner and Ildiko Zirighne Sos.
 Head coach: Tamás Faragó.

Italy
 Carmela Allucci, Alexandra Araujo, Silvia Bosurgi, Francesca Conti, Tania di Mario, Elena Gigli, Melania Grego, Martina Miceli, Giusi Malato, Maddalena Musumeci, Cinzia Ragusa, Noémi Tóth and Manuela Zanchi.
 Head coach: Pierluigi Formiconi.

Kazakhstan
 Yekaterina Gariyeva, Marina Gritsenko, Tatyana Gubina, Natalya Ignatyeva, Assel Jakayeva, Svetlana Khapsalis, Alyona Klimenko, Svetlana Koroleva, Natalya Krassilnikova, Larissa Mikhailova, Galina Rytova, Irina Tolkunova and Anna Zubkova.
 Head coach: Stanislav Pivovarov.

Russia
 Svetlana Bogdanova, Sofya Konukh, Tatiana Petrova, Ekaterina Salimova, Natalia Shepelina, Ekaterina Shishova, Elena Smurova, Olga Turova, Ekaterina Vassilieva, Valentina Vorontsova, Maria Yaina, Galina Zlotnikova and Anastassia Zoubkova.
 Head coach: Alexander Kleymenov.

United States
 Robin Beauregard, Margaret Dingeldein, Ellen Estes, Jacqueline Frank, Natalie Golda, Ericka Lorenz, Heather Moody, Thalia Munro, Nicolle Payne, Heather Petri, Kelly Rulon, Amber Stachowski and Brenda Villa.
 Head coach: Guy Baker.

See also
 2004 Men's Water Polo Olympic Qualifier

References

Sources
 PDF documents in the LA84 Foundation Digital Library:
 Official Results Book – 2004 Olympic Games – Water Polo (download, archive)
 Water polo on the Olympedia website
 Water polo at the 2004 Summer Olympics (men's tournament, women's tournament)
 Water polo on the Sports Reference website
 Water polo at the 2004 Summer Games (men's tournament, women's tournament) (archived)

External links
result book – Water Polo

 
2004 Summer Olympics events
O
2004
2004